Anao, officially the Municipality of Anao, is a 5th class municipality in the province of Tarlac, Philippines. According to the 2020 census, it has a population of 12,208 people.

Formerly a part of Pangasinan province, Anao was founded and organized into a municipality on March 16, 1870. Every year on the March 16, the foundation of the town is celebrated along with the Ylang-Ylang Festival.

Geography
Located in the north-eastern part of Tarlac, it is bound on the north by San Manuel, in the east by Nampicuan, on the south by Ramos and on the west by Paniqui and Moncada.

Barangays
Anao is politically subdivided into 18 barangays.

 Baguindoc (Baguinloc)
 Bantog
 Campos
 Carmen
 Casili
 Don Ramon
 Hernando
 Poblacion
 Rizal
 San Francisco East
 San Francisco West
 San Jose North
 San Jose South
 San Juan
 San Roque
 Santo Domingo
 Sinense
 Suaverdez

Climate

Demographics

Anao is predominantly an Ilocano-speaking town although most are fluent in Tagalog. Other languages like Kapampangan and Pangasinan are spoken by about 10% of the population.

Aglipayan and Roman Catholicism are two of the predominant religions in the municipality. Other groups having a large number of members in the municipality are the Church of Jesus Christ of Latter-day Saints, Iglesia ni Cristo, and Protestantism.

Economy

History
The area where Anao is located was inhabited before 1800 by people from the Ilocos Region. In 1835, a group of immigrants from Paoay, Ilocos Norte reached the region and first settled near a creek on the bank where there were balete trees. These immigrants called their settlement Balete. The immigrants found the region where they settled to have many agricultural prospects and this attracted more immigrants who came from the north, especially from the town of Paoay.

The settlement expanded and later changed its name to "Barrio Anao" (deriving authentically from the Ilocano word danao which means creek and due to the anahao leaf that grows in various area they derive the name Anao). By that time, balete trees were extinguished and the barrio was adjacent in all directions by creeks.

Paniqui had a road extended towards the east to Anao. Paniqui claimed Anao as its barrio and the people of the barrio accepted the claim. Years went by and Anao expanded. In 1870, a petition was made and approved that Anao be made a municipality.

Past mayors

Points of interest
The Saint John Nepomucene Parish Church of Anao can be found on the center of the town near the municipal hall. It belongs to the Roman Catholic Diocese of Tarlac.

The Ylang Ylang Festival is celebrated by the municipality every 16 March to take pride of their main local products, which are perfumes and essentials oils made from the ylang-ylang flower. The town has over 10,000 ylang-ylang trees, many of them lined on the local main road, which are harvested and highly valued for its perfume.

Gallery

References

External links

 Anao Municipal Government Website
 Anao Profile at PhilAtlas.com
 Anao town
 [ Philippine Standard Geographic Code]
 Philippine Census Information
 Local Governance Performance Management System

Municipalities of Tarlac